Rumiana Ivanova is a Bulgarian female badminton player. In 2012, she became the runner-up of the Bulgaria Hebar Open tournament in women's doubles event with her partner Dimitria Popstoikova.

Achievements

BWF International Challenge/Series
Women's Doubles

 BWF International Challenge tournament
 BWF International Series tournament
 BWF Future Series tournament

References

External links
 

Living people
Year of birth missing (living people)
Place of birth missing (living people)
Bulgarian female badminton players